The 1899–1900 season was the fifth competitive season in Belgian football.

Overview
Only one official division existed at the time, split into two leagues.  It was called Coupe de Championnat (Championship Cup) and its winner was decided after a two-legged final match between the winners of each league.

At the end of the season it was decided to merge the two league in one.  Antwerp F.C. withdrew from the league after nearly every player left the club for the new Beerschot and F.C. Courtraisien was relegated.  The clubs that replaced those two were Beerschot and Verviers F.C.

Honour

Final tables

League standings

Championship Group A

|}
Racing Club de Bruxelles Qualified for the National Final.

Championship Group B

Final

|}

External links
RSSSF archive - Final tables 1895-2002
Belgian clubs history

 
Seasons in Belgian football
Belgian